Sir Edward Boys (1579–1646), of Fredville, Nonington, Kent, was an English politician.

He was the son of Sir Edward Boys of Fredville and educated at Corpus Christi College, Cambridge (1594) and the Middle Temple (1599). He was knighted in March 1604.

He was a Member (MP) of the Parliament of England for Fowey in 1614, Christchurch c. June 1625, Sandwich on 21 February 1626 and Dover in April 1640 and November 1640 – 11 August 1646. He was Lord Warden of the Cinque Ports and Governor of Dover Castle in 1642–1646.

He married in 1604, Elizabeth, the daughter and coheiress of Alexander Hammon of Acrise, Kent, and had six sons and six daughters.

References

1579 births
1646 deaths
Alumni of Corpus Christi College, Cambridge
Members of the Middle Temple
Members of the Parliament of England for Dover
Knights Bachelor
Members of the pre-1707 English Parliament for constituencies in Cornwall
English MPs 1614
English MPs 1625
English MPs 1626
English MPs 1640 (April)
English MPs 1640–1648